Pterolophosoma is an extinct genus of beetle in the family Cerambycidae, containing a single known species, Pterolophosoma otiliae. It was described by Vitali in 2006 who found it in a Dominican amber dating to Early Miocene.

References

†
Prehistoric beetles
†
Burdigalian life
Neogene Dominican Republic
Miocene insects of North America
Prehistoric insects of the Caribbean
†
†
Fossils of the Dominican Republic
Dominican amber
Fossil taxa described in 2006
†